Vermont elected its members September 7, 1824.  Congressional districts were re-established in Vermont for the 1824 election. Vermont had used an  1812-1818 and 1822. A majority was required for election, which was not met in the 1st district, necessitating a second election December 6, 1824.

See also 
 1824 Vermont's at-large congressional district special election
 1824 and 1825 United States House of Representatives elections
 List of United States representatives from Vermont

1824
Vermont
United States House of Representatives